Broadcast Markup Language, or BML, is an XML-based standard developed by Japan's Association of Radio Industries and Businesses as a data broadcasting specification for digital television broadcasting. It is a data-transmission service allowing text to be displayed on a 1seg TV screen.

The text contains news, sports, weather forecasts, emergency warnings such as Earthquake Early Warning, etc. free of charge. It was finalized in 1999, becoming ARIB STD-B24 Data Coding and Transmission Specification for Digital Broadcasting.

The STD-B24 specification is derived from an early draft of XHTML 1.0 strict, which it extends and alters. Some subset of CSS 1 and 2 is supported, as well as ECMAScript.

Example BML header:
<?xml version="1.0" encoding="EUC-JP" ?>
<!DOCTYPE bml PUBLIC "+//ARIB STD-B24:1999//DTD BML Document//JA" "bml_1_0.dtd">
<?bml bml-version="1.0" ?>

However, due to a large installed user base of receivers which only support the original 1.0 specification, broadcasters are not able to introduce new features defined in later revisions.

See also 
 ARIB STD B24 character set
 Integrated Services Digital Broadcasting
 1seg
 Ginga (SBTVD Middleware)

Further reading
 
 
 
 
 
 Broadcast Markup Language (BML) at OASIS

External links
 Official changelog for ARIB STD-B24 
 STD-B24 and others, List of ARIB Standards in the Field of Broadcasting (ARIB)

Broadcast engineering
Digital television
High-definition television
Industry-specific XML-based standards
Interactive television
ISDB
Satellite television
Japanese inventions
Telecommunications-related introductions in 1999